"When a Woman" is a song by English recording artist Gabrielle. It was written by Gabrielle along with Richard Stannard and Julian Gallagher and released as the third single from her third album, Rise (1999), on 5 June 2000. The song reached number six on the UK Singles Chart, becoming the second-highest-charting single from the album as well as Gabrielle's eighth top-10 hit.

Track listings

Credits and personnel
Credits are lifted from the Rise album booklet.

Studios
 Recorded at Windmill Lane Studios (Dublin, Ireland) and Biffco Studio

Personnel

 Gabrielle – writing, vocals
 Richard Stannard – writing, production
 Julian Gallagher – writing, production
 John Themis – guitars
 Eamonn Nolan – flugelhorn
 Stephen McKeon – string arrangement
 Adrian Bushby – mixing

Charts

References

Gabrielle (singer) songs
1999 songs
2000 singles
Go! Beat singles
Song recordings produced by Richard Stannard (songwriter)
Songs written by Gabrielle (singer)
Songs written by Julian Gallagher
Songs written by Richard Stannard (songwriter)